The world average of female top executives is 8 percent. Thailand has the highest proportion of female CEOs in the world, with 30 percent of companies employing female CEOs, followed by the People's Republic of China, with 19 percent. In the European Union the figure is 9 percent and in the United States it's 5 percent. Only 14.2% of the top five leadership positions at the companies in the S&P 500 are held by women, according to a recent CNNMoney analysis, out of those 500 companies, there are only 24 female CEOs.

Female CEOs

A number of women have risen to become top executives of major corporations. Below is an incomplete list of such women.
Brenda C. Barnes, former CEO of Sara Lee
Jhane Barnes, owner fashion design company
Mary Barra, chairman and CEO of General Motors
Corie Barry, CEO of Best Buy
Ana Botín, President of Banco Santander, Spain
Gail Koziara Boudreaux, CEO of Anthem
Angela Braly, former President and CEO of WellPoint (now Anthem)
Heather Bresch, Mylan Inc
Michele Buck, CEO and President of The Hershey Company
Ursula Burns, CEO and Chairman of Xerox
Liz Claiborne, Chairperson and CEO of Liz Claiborne, Inc.
Zoe Cruz, Co-President of Morgan Stanley
Mary Dillon, CEO of Ulta Beauty
Patricia Dunn, former Chairman of Hewlett Packard
Annika Falkengren, CEO of SEB, Sweden
Carly Fiorina, former Chairman and CEO of Hewlett Packard
Clara Furse, former CEO of London Stock Exchange
Linda Hasenfratz, CEO of Linamar
Annie Hurlbut, CEO and co-founder of Peruvian Connection
Kathy Ireland, Chairman, CEO and Chief Designer for Kathy Ireland Worldwide and Chairman Emeritus for Level Brands
Lisa S. Jones CEO of EyeMail Inc.
Andrea Jung, Chairman and CEO of Avon Products
Joyce Mackenzie Liu, CEO of Pegafund
Indra Krishnamurthy Nooyi, President and CEO of PepsiCo
Marianne Nivert, former CEO of Telia (now TeliaSonera), Sweden
Ginni Rometty, former CEO of IBM
Irene Rosenfeld, CEO of Kraft Foods
Rasha Al Roumi, former CEO of Kuwait Airways
Patricia Russo, CEO of Lucent
Güler Sabancı , CEO of Sabancı Holding, Turkey
Mary Sammons, President and CEO of Rite Aid
Martha Stewart, former CEO of Martha Stewart Living Omnimedia
Belinda Stronach, former President and CEO of Magna International
Lisa Su, President, CEO and Chair of AMD
Cydni Tetro, CEO of Brandless
Therese Tucker, founder and CEO of BlackLine 
Laura Wade-Gery, CEO of Multi-channel at Marks & Spencer, former CEO of Tesco.com
Meg Whitman, former CEO of eBay, present CEO of Hewlett Packard
Geisha Williams, CEO and President of President of PG&E Corporation
Kathryn Farmer, President and CEO of BNSF Railway

References

Executives, female
Executives